Pantelis Papadopoulos (1902 – 1987) was a Greek tennis player. He competed in the men's singles and doubles events at the 1924 Summer Olympics.

References

External links
 

1902 births
1987 deaths
Greek male tennis players
Olympic tennis players of Greece
Tennis players at the 1924 Summer Olympics
Place of birth missing
Sportspeople from Istanbul
Constantinopolitan Greeks